The 1998 Missouri Tigers football team represented the University of Missouri during the 1998 NCAA Division I-A football season. They played their home games at Faurot Field in Columbia, Missouri.  The 1998 Tigers had an overall record of 8-4 (5-3 in conference play), including a 34–31 win in the Insight.com Bowl over West Virginia at Tucson.  They were members of the Big 12 Conference in the North Division. The team was coached by head coach Larry Smith.  West Virginia took Missouri's spot in the Big 12 when the latter joined the SEC fourteen years later.

Schedule

Coaching staff

Rankings

Game summaries

Bowling Green

Kansas

Ohio State

Northwestern State

Iowa State

Oklahoma

Nebraska

Texas Tech

Colorado

Texas A&M

Kansas State

1998 Insight.com Bowl

References

Missouri
Missouri Tigers football seasons
Guaranteed Rate Bowl champion seasons
Missouri Tigers football